Longitarsus linnaei is a species of beetle of the Chrysomelidae family and the subfamily Galerucinae. It is distributed in the southern part of France, southern Central Europe, Italy and the Balkan Peninsula (with the exception of the southern part of Greece), the Caucasus, Asia Minor, Israel, Palestine, north-eastern Algeria and Tunisia.

Variety
Longitarsus linnaei var. amoenus Weise, 1888
Longitarsus linnaei var. scrutator Weise, 1890

References

External links
Longitarsus linnaei (Duftschmid, 1825) (Chrysomelidae) — photo by ME Smirnov

Notes

L
Beetles described in 1825
Beetles of North Africa
Beetles of Asia
Beetles of Europe